Sharrott Winery (pronounced  ) is a winery in the Blue Anchor section of Winslow Township in Camden County, New Jersey. Formerly an apple orchard, the vineyard was first planted in 2005, and opened to the public in 2008. Sharrott has 20 acres of grapes under cultivation, and produces 12,000 cases of wine per year. The winery is named after the family that owns it.

Wines
Sharrott Winery is in the Outer Coastal Plain AVA, and produces wine from Cabernet Franc, Cabernet Sauvignon, Chambourcin, Chardonnay, Fredonia, Merlot, Pinot gris, Riesling, Vidal blanc, and Vignoles (Ravat 51) grapes.

Features, licensing, associations, and outlets
The entire winery facility is powered using solar energy. Sharrott has a plenary winery license from the New Jersey Division of Alcoholic Beverage Control, which allows it to produce an unrestricted amount of wine, operate up to 15 off-premises sales rooms, and ship up to 12 cases per year to consumers in-state or out-of-state. The winery is a member of the Garden State Wine Growers Association and the Outer Coastal Plain Vineyard Association. In 2013, Sharrott became the first winery in the state to have a theatre as an outlet where its wine is sold by the glass to patrons.

See also
Alcohol laws of New Jersey
American wine
Judgment of Princeton
List of wineries, breweries, and distilleries in New Jersey
New Jersey Farm Winery Act
New Jersey Wine Industry Advisory Council
New Jersey wine

References

External links
Garden State Wine Growers Association
Outer Coastal Plain Vineyard Association

Wineries in New Jersey
Tourist attractions in Camden County, New Jersey
Winslow Township, New Jersey